Moti Lal Dhar ( 22 October 1914 – 20 January 2002) was an eminent drug chemist, and science administrator in India. He remained Director Central Drug Research Institute, Lucknow from 1960 until his retirement in 1972 and he has been the only Kashmiri Pandit to serve as Vice- Chancellor, of Banaras Hindu University, B.H.U.

References 

1914 births
2002 deaths
20th-century Indian chemists
Vice Chancellors of Banaras Hindu University
Kashmiri people
People from Srinagar district
Recipients of the Padma Shri in science & engineering